The Pontifical Alphonsian Academy, also commonly known as the Alphonsianum, is a pontifical institution of higher education founded in 1949 by the Redemptorists and located in Rome, Italy.

Since 1960, the Academy has specialized in moral theology as a part of the Faculty of Theology of the Pontifical Lateran University. In 2023, Pope Francis granted the institute the title of "Pontifical." The Academy grants both the licentiate and the doctoral degrees in moral theology.

Notable alumni

Cardinals
 Francesco Coccopalmerio (1938– )
 Polycarp Pengo (1944–)
 Severino Poletto (1933–2022) 
 Óscar Rodríguez Maradiaga (1942– )

Archbishops and bishops
 Joseph Charron (1939–)
 Peter Comensoli (1960– )
 James D. Conley (1955– )
 Earl K. Fernandes (1972– )
 Patrick Hoogmartens (1952– )
 Carl Frederick Mengeling (1930–)
 Franco Mulakkal (1964– )
 John Clayton Nienstedt (1947– )
 Michael Fors Olson (1966– )
 Luigi Padovese (1947–2010)
 Wojciech Polak (1964– )
 Joseph Indrias Rehmat (1966- )
 Hipólito Reyes Larios (1946–2021) 
 Luis José Rueda Aparicio (1962– )
 Michael Sis (1960– )
 Fikremariam Hagos Tsalim (1970– )
 Edmund James Whalen (1958–)
 John Wilson (1968-)
 Anicetus Bongsu Antonius Sinaga (1941-2020)

Theologians
 Charles E. Curran (1934– )

References

External links

Pope John Paul II. "Address to the Congregation of the Most Holy Redeemer", October 3, 2003
 "Address of His Holiness Pope Francis to Teachers and Students of the Alphonsian Academy Higher Institute of Theology", Holy See Press Office, February 9, 2019 

1949 establishments in Italy
Education in Rome